The Scottdale Giants were a minor league baseball, based in Scottdale, Pennsylvania in 1907. That season the team was a member of the Western Pennsylvania League. However to begin the 1908 season, they were renamed the Scottdale Millers and moved into the Pennsylvania–West Virginia League. During the 1908 season, the team relocated to Grafton, West Virginia and became the Grafton Wanderers.

References

Baseball teams established in 1907
Defunct minor league baseball teams
Pennsylvania-West Virginia League teams
Western Pennsylvania League teams
1908 establishments in Pennsylvania
Sports clubs disestablished in 1908
Defunct baseball teams in Pennsylvania
Baseball teams disestablished in 1908